Turkey Creek Township is one of seventeen townships in Kosciusko County, Indiana. As of the 2010 census, its population was 8,428 and it contained 5,545 housing units.

Turkey Creek Township was organized in 1836.

Geography

Cities and towns
 Syracuse

Unincorporated towns
 Buttermilk Point at 
 Cedar Point at 
 Enchanted Hills at 
 Kanata Manayunk at 
 Marineland Gardens at 
 Oakwood Park at 
 Pickwick Park at 
 Quaker Haven Park at 
 South Park at 
 Vawter Park at 
 Wawasee at 
 Wawasee Village at 
(This list is based on USGS data and may include former settlements.)

Education 
Turkey Creek Township residents may obtain a free library card from the Syracuse-Turkey Creek Township Public Library in Syracuse.

References

External links
 Indiana Township Association
 United Township Association of Indiana

Townships in Kosciusko County, Indiana
Townships in Indiana